Minshull Street Crown Court is a complex of court buildings on Minshull Street in Manchester. The court was designated a Grade II* listed building on 3 October 1974.

History

The foundation stone for the building was laid by the mayor on 10 July 1860. The building was designed by the architect Thomas Worthington and was completed in December 1871.

The style is Worthington's trademark flamboyant Flemish Gothic with a massive corner tower and a chimney stack styled as a campanile.  The courts are constructed in red brick with sandstone dressings and steeply-pitched slate roofs.  There is a profusion of animal carving by Earp and Hobbs.  Worthington drew both on his rejected designs for the Town Hall, and on his earlier plans for Ellen Wilkinson High School, although the central tower he used there is placed asymmetrically at the Police Courts, due to the constraints of the site. The interior court rooms "have been preserved with relatively few alterations."

Following the completion of new Courts of Justice in Crown Square in May 1961, the Lord Chancellor's Department decided to close the Minshull Street building in 1989, but as the volume of cases increased in the early 1990s, the Department decided to re-open the Minshull Street building again to support the Courts of Justice in Crown Square. Between 1993 and 1996, the Minshull Street buildings were extensively modernised.  The original courtyard was glazed over and an extension was added to the Aytoun Street side of the courts. The architect for these works was James Stevenson of the Hurd Rolland Partnership. Internally, the modernised complex at Minshull Street was laid out to accommodate twelve courts.

Notable cases include the conviction of the gambler, Ming Jiang, in February 2023, for the murder of his gambling companion, Yang Liu, whose headless body was found on a country lane.

See also

Grade II* listed buildings in Greater Manchester
Listed buildings in Manchester-M1

Notes

Sources 

Grade II* listed buildings in Manchester
Gothic Revival architecture in Greater Manchester
History of Manchester
Court buildings in England
Crown Court buildings
Government buildings completed in 1871